Gunilla "Nilla" Bergman (born 29 January 1949) is a Swedish curler and curling coach.

In 1982 she was inducted into the Swedish Curling Hall of Fame.

Teams

Record as a coach of national teams

References

External links
 

Living people
1949 births
Swedish female curlers
Swedish curling champions
Swedish curling coaches